Lucimar Teodoro (born 1 May 1981) is a Brazilian track and field athlete who specialises in the 400 metres sprint and the 400 metres hurdles.

Teodoro was born in Guararapes, São Paulo and began competing in senior athletics in 2001. She attended her first Olympics at the 2004 Athens Games as part of the 4×400 metres relay team. However, the team did not reach the final of the event. Teodoro won both the sprint and hurdling 400 m titles at the 2005 national championships and reached the semi-finals of sprint event at the 2005 World Championships in Athletics. She competed at the following World Championships in Osaka, this time in the 400 m hurdles, but did not progress to the finals. At the 2008 Beijing Olympics Teodoro represented Brazil in the 400 m hurdles, and the 4×400 metres relay.

She set a new South American record in the 400 m hurdles with a time of 55.84 seconds in Belém at the Grande Prêmio Brasil Caixa meet in May 2009. Following this, she finished second at the Troféu Brasil Caixa de Atletismo to Luciana França, who challenged Teodoro's record by running a new personal best of 55.90 seconds. In July, she won the gold at the 2009 Lusophony Games.

However, she tested positive for banned substances (Fenproporex) soon after and was provisionally banned from competition and was not selected for the 2009 World Championships in Athletics. After admitting her use of a banned substance, she was suspended from competition for the minimum of two years by the Brazilian Athletics Confederation.

Achievements

Personal bests

All information taken from IAAF profile.

See also
List of doping cases in sport

References

External links
 
 

1981 births
Living people
Brazilian female sprinters
Brazilian female hurdlers
Athletes (track and field) at the 2003 Pan American Games
Athletes (track and field) at the 2004 Summer Olympics
Athletes (track and field) at the 2008 Summer Olympics
Doping cases in athletics
Olympic athletes of Brazil
Brazilian sportspeople in doping cases
Pan American Games athletes for Brazil
Pan American Games medalists in athletics (track and field)
Pan American Games bronze medalists for Brazil
Medalists at the 2003 Pan American Games
Sportspeople from São Paulo (state)
21st-century Brazilian women
20th-century Brazilian women